The wheel of time or wheel of history (also known as Kalachakra) is a concept found in several religious traditions and philosophies, notably religions of Indian origin such as Hinduism, Jainism, Sikhism, and Buddhism, which regard time as cyclical and consisting of repeating ages.  Many other cultures contain belief in a similar concept: notably, the Q'ero Natives of Peru, as well as the Hopi Natives of Arizona.

Hinduism

In Hindu cosmology, kala (time) is eternal, repeating general events in four types of cycles. The smallest cycle is a maha-yuga (great age), containing four yugas (dharmic ages): Satya Yuga, Treta Yuga, Dvapara Yuga and Kali Yuga. A manvantara (age of Manu) contains 71 maha-yugas. A kalpa (day of Brahma) contains 14 manvantaras and 15 sandhyas (connecting periods), which lasts for 1,000 maha-yugas and is followed by a pralaya (night of partial dissolution) of equal length, where a day and night make one full day. A maha-kalpa (life of Brahma) lasts for 100 of Brahma's years of 12 months of 30 full days (100 360-day years) or 72,000,000 maha-yugas, which is followed by a maha-pralaya (full dissolution) of equal length.

Buddhism

The Wheel of Time or Kalachakra is a Tantric deity that is associated with Tibetan Tantric Buddhism, which encompasses all four main schools of Sakya, Nyingma, Kagyu and Gelug, and is especially important within the lesser-known Jonang tradition.

The Kalachakra tantra prophesies a world within which (religious) conflict is prevalent. A worldwide war will be waged which will see the expansion of the mystical Kingdom of Shambhala led by a messianic king.

Jainism

Within Jainism, time is thought to be a wheel that rotates for infinity without a beginning. This wheel of time holds twelve spokes that each symbolize a different phase in the universe's cosmological history. It is further divided into two equal halves having six eras in them. While in a downward motion, the wheel of time falls into what is known as Avasarpiṇī and when in an upward motion, enters a state called Utsarpini. During both motions of the wheel, 24 tirthankaras come forth to teach the three jewels or sacred Jain teachings of right faith, right knowledge, and right practice, then create a spiritual ford across the ocean of rebirth for humanity.

Ancient Rome
The philosopher and emperor Marcus Aurelius saw time as extending forwards to infinity and backwards to infinity, while admitting the possibility (without arguing the case) that "the administration of the universe is organized into a succession of finite periods".

Modern usage

Literature
In an interview included with the audiobook editions of his novels, author Robert Jordan has stated that his bestselling fantasy series The Wheel of Time borrows the titular concept from Hindu mythology.

Television
Several episodes of the American TV series Lost feature a wheel that can be physically turned in order to manipulate space and time. In a series of episodes during the fifth season, the island on which the show takes place begins to skip violently back and forth through time after the wheel is pulled off its axis.

See also
Eternal return
Kalachakra
Wheel of the Year

References

Sources

Hindu philosophical concepts
Jain cosmology
Time in religion
Buddhist cosmology
Time in Hinduism
Time in Buddhism